Counter Intuitive Records is an American independent record label based in Boston, Massachusetts known for working with bands such as Oso Oso, Mom Jeans, Sleeping Patterns and Prince Daddy & The Hyena. The label has also handled distribution for artists such as The Hotelier.

History
The label was started in 2015 by Jake Sulzer, shortly after his college graduation. After stumbling across a demo by the band Bay Faction, Sulzer offered them a record contract. Gaining most traction from releasing the debut record of California band Mom Jeans, the label funded the release of many lesser bands in the scene, like Pictures of Vernon or Who Loves You.

Current artists

Former artists

References

American independent record labels
Record labels based in Massachusetts
Companies based in Boston
Record labels established in 2015